Lou Ye, born 1965, is a Chinese screenwriter-director who is commonly grouped with the "Sixth Generation" directors of Chinese cinema.

Films
Born in Shanghai, Lou was educated at the Beijing Film Academy. In 1993, he made his first film Weekend Lover, but it was not released until two years later, having its world premiere at the International Filmfestival Mannheim-Heidelberg where it received the Rainer Werner Fassbinder Award. Between completion and premiere of Weekend Lover he made and released Don't Be Young, a thriller about a girl who takes her nightmares as real, in 1994. Lou, however, did not gain international prominence until his third film, the neo-noir Suzhou River. That film dealt with questions of identity and proved quite controversial upon its release in China. Upon its release, international audiences praised Suzhou River, which several critics felt evoked Alfred Hitchcock's Vertigo, particularly in how both films focus on a man obsessed with a mysterious woman.

In 2003 Lou released Purple Butterfly starring Zhang Ziyi. The film is a tale of revenge and betrayal taking place during the Japanese occupation of Shanghai, with a complex narrative structure borrowing heavily from film noir traditions.

Lou's next film, Summer Palace (2006), a story of two lovers in the backdrop of the Tiananmen Square protests of 1989, again brought Lou into conflict with Chinese authorities, resulting in a five-year ban for both him and his producer. In order to circumvent the ban, his next film, Spring Fever, was shot surreptitiously in Nanjing and registered as a Hong Kong-French coproduction to avoid censors. The film was shown in competition at the 62nd Cannes Film Festival where writer Mei Feng won the Best Screenplay award.

In 1998, Lou, along with actress Nai An (who had starred in his first two films, and would go on to star in Suzhou River) started the production company Dream Factory, which would go on to produce all of Lou's films.

Censorship Issues 
Lou Ye's films have proven controversial in their content, and often deal with issues of sexuality, gender, and obsession.  Government censors banned his first film Weekend Lover for two years, while his breakout film Suzhou River was banned (with Lou receiving a 2-year ban from filmmaking) but has since been authorized in China.

Later, after Lou submitted Summer Palace to the 2006 Cannes Film Festival without approval from Chinese censors, he was banned from film-making again, this time for five years. The film itself was also banned, though according to Lou this was because it was not up to the SARFT's standards for picture and sound quality.

In 2016, Lou's The Shadow Play wrapped the shooting. The film deals with Forced evictions, demonstration by residents and violent scenes, e.g., killing and body burning. Hong Kong actor Edison Chen also performed in this film. Therefore, the film couldn't get permission for screening for more than two years. In 2018, the film finally made its world premiere in Taiwan's Golden Horse Film Festival.

Filmography

References

External links

 
 
 Lou Ye at the Chinese Movie Database
 Interview with Lou Ye at Telepolis (German)

Film directors from Shanghai
Screenwriters from Shanghai
Beijing Film Academy alumni
1965 births
Living people
International Writing Program alumni